Hanho Heung-Up Co., Ltd. is an animation service studio based in Seoul, South Korea. Founded in 1984 by Steven Hahn, over the years the studio has produced animation for many of the industry’s leading SVOD, cable, and broadcast studios and distributors, including Disney, Warner Bros., Fox, Netflix, Nickelodeon, Comedy Central, and others. Hanho has worked on dozens of TV-series and feature films, including: Alvin and the Chipmunks, Star Wars: Droids, The Real Ghostbusters, Teenage Mutant Ninja Turtles, The Spectacular Spider-Man, Bob's Burgers, Doug, The New Adventures of Winnie the Pooh, The Magic School Bus, Turbo FAST, Paradise PD, and many more. In its native land, Hanho is best known for its work on ly, Superboard, which aired on the KBS network from 1990 to 2002.

The company traces it origins to Dong Seo Animation, established in 1973, which itself traces its origins to International Art Production, a studio responsible for Colorized Redraws of Betty Boop, Krazy Kat, and other old B&W Cartoons in the Late 60's and Early 70's.

Kim Seok-ki is the company's President and CEO.

Production credits

Original productions
 Dooly the Little Dinosaur (아기공룡 둘리) (October 1987 – May 1988, Animation production shared with AKOM, Shin Dong-heon Productions and Sam Young Animation)
 Guru Cabbage and Guru Radish's Once Upon a Time (배추도사 무도사의 옛날 옛적에) (1990, Animation production shared with Dong Yang Animation, Shin Won Animation and Take One)
 Fly, Superboard (날아라 슈퍼보드) (August 1990 – January 2002)
 Eunbi & Kabi's Once Upon a Time (은비 까비의 옛날 옛적에) (1991, Animation production shared with Sei Young Animation and Dong Woo Animation)
 Sun-Shining Tree (햇살나무) (September 23, 1991)
 Hocus Pocus! Story Pouch (콩딱쿵! 이야기 주머니) (1997, Animation production shared with AKOM and Shin Won Productions)
 My Dear Daigoro (내친구 다이고로) (2003)
 Sao Village (사오마을 대소동) (2003)
 Elysium (엘리시움) (2003, Credited as Hanho Animation)

External links
 Official site
 co-productions database

South Korean animation studios
Entertainment companies of South Korea
Companies established in 1984
1984 establishments in South Korea
Mass media in Seoul